Veryovkin 1-y is a rural locality (a settlement) in Nizhnekamenskoye Rural Settlement, Talovsky District, Voronezh Oblast, Russia. The population was 99 as of 2010.

Geography 
Veryovkin 1-y is located 5 km east of Talovaya (the district's administrative centre) by road. Talovaya is the nearest rural locality.

References 

Rural localities in Talovsky District